"Home" is a song by English electronic music group Depeche Mode, released on 16 June 1997 as the third single from their ninth album, Ultra (1997). The song is sung by guitarist Martin Gore, rather than the band's main singer, Dave Gahan.

Critical reception
Larry Flick from Billboard wrote that the song "shows the venerable electronic group in a predictably melancholy mood. But who cares? Few acts can dish out the angst better, and "Home" pleases with its baroque strings and skittling beat." He added, "Modern rock radio is a given. The question hanging in the balance is whether popsters will once again welcome Depeche Mode onto top 40 airwaves. Hard to say, though this is certainly the act's best mainstream single in a good long time." Pan-European magazine Music & Media deemed it as a "somewhat subdued but still sparkling affair." A reviewer from Music Week rated it four out of five, describing it as "a downbeat track with an upbeat message, strong on strings and big synth sounds. Lighters aloft."

Track listings

 12-inch, Mute / 12Bong27 (UK)
 "Home" (Jedi Knights remix (Drowning in Time)) (7:02)
 "Home" (Air "Around the Golf" remix) (3:57)
 "Home" (LFO Meant to Be) (4:26)
 "Home" (Grantby mix) (4:39) (remixed by Dan Grigson/Grantby)

 CD, Mute / CDBong27 (UK)
 "Home" (5:46)
 "Home" (Air "Around the Golf" remix) (3:57)
 "Home" (LFO Meant to Be) (4:26)
 "Home" (The Noodles & The Damage Done) (6:36) (remixed by Skylab)

 CD, Mute / LCDBong27 (UK)
 "Home" (Jedi Knights remix (Drowning in Time)) (7:02)
 "Home" (Grantby mix) (4:39)
 "Barrel of a Gun" (live) (6:02)
 "It's No Good" (live) (4:06)

 CD, Mute / CDBong27X (EU)
 "Home" (5:46)
 "Home" (Air "Around the Golf" remix) (3:56)
 "Home" (LFO Meant to Be) (4:26)
 "Home" (The Noodles & The Damage Done) (6:36)
 "Home" (Jedi Knights remix (Drowning in Time)) (7:01)
 "Home" (Grantby mix) (4:40)
 "Barrel of a Gun" (live) (6:02)
 "It's No Good" (live) (4:06)
This CD is the 2004 re-release

 CD-R, Tape-to-tape / Bong 27 (UK)
 "Home" (instrumental) (3:59)

"Home" and "Useless"

On 18 November 1997, "Home" and "Useless" were released as a double A-side single in the United States and Canada. The front cover art has the "Home" cover on the front, with the "Home" track list, and the back cover art has the "Useless" cover art, with the "Useless" track list.

Track listings
 7-inch, Reprise / 7-17314 (US)
 "Home" (5:46)
 "Useless" [CJ Bolland Ultrasonar edit] (4:06)

 CD, Reprise / 9 17314-2 (US)
 "Home" (5:46)
 "Home" [Air "Around the Golf" remix] (3:58)
 "Useless" [CJ Bolland Ultrasonar edit] (4:06)

 CD, Reprise / 9 43906-2 (US)
 "Home" (5:46)
 "Home" [Grantby mix] (4:38)
 "Home" [LFO Meant to Be] (4:26)
 "Home" [The Noodles and The Damage Done] (6:22)
 "Useless" [CJ Bolland Ultrasonar mix] (6:00)
 "Useless" [CJ Bolland Funky Sub mix] (5:38)
 "Useless" [Kruder + Dorfmeister Session ™] (9:10)
 "Useless" [Escape from Wherever: parts 1 & 2] (7:15)
 "Barrel of a Gun" (video)
 "It's No Good" (video)
 "Home" (video)
 "Useless" (video)

Charts

References

External links
 Single information from the official Depeche Mode web site
 [ AllMusic review of "Home" single] 

1997 singles
1997 songs
Depeche Mode songs
Mute Records singles
Song recordings produced by Bomb the Bass
Songs written by Martin Gore